Joe Friday is the current  Public Sector Integrity Commissioner of Canada.

Education
Friday holds a Bachelor of Journalism (Honors) from Carleton University and a Bachelor of Laws from the University of Ottawa.

Career
Prior to his appointment, Friday served as Deputy Public Sector Integrity Commissioner from 2011 until his appointment in 2015.

Prior to joining the public service, Friday practiced law at the firm Osler, Hoskin & Halcourt.

Appointment
Friday was appointed as Public Sector Integrity Commissioner of Canada on March 27, 2015.

References

Living people
Carleton University alumni
Year of birth missing (living people)